Aleksandr Aleksandrovich Makarenko (born 4 February 1986) is a Russian former professional footballer.

Club career
He made his debut in the Russian Premier League for FC Saturn Ramenskoye on 22 May 2005 in a game against PFC Krylia Sovetov Samara.

In 2010, he participated in the Europa League campaign of FC Sibir Novosibirsk.

References

1986 births
Living people
Russian people of Ukrainian descent
Russian footballers
Association football midfielders
FC Saturn Ramenskoye players
FC Sibir Novosibirsk players
Russian Premier League players
FC Zhemchuzhina Sochi players
FC SKA-Khabarovsk players
FC Arsenal Tula players
FC Baltika Kaliningrad players
FC Luch Vladivostok players
Sportspeople from Novosibirsk